The following is a partial list of the "D" codes for Medical Subject Headings (MeSH), as defined by the United States National Library of Medicine (NLM).

This list continues the information at List of MeSH codes (D12.776). Codes following these are found at List of MeSH codes (D20). For other MeSH codes, see List of MeSH codes.

The source for this content is the set of 2006 MeSH Trees from the NLM.

– nucleic acids, nucleotides, and nucleosides

– antisense elements (genetics)

– DNA, antisense
  – oligodeoxyribonucleotides, antisense

– oligonucleotides, antisense
  – oligodeoxyribonucleotides, antisense
  – oligoribonucleotides, antisense

– rna, antisense
  – micrornas
  – oligoribonucleotides, antisense
  – rna, small interfering

– nucleic acid precursors

– rna precursors

– nucleic acids

– DNA
  – DNA adducts
  – DNA, a-form
  – DNA, algal
  – DNA, antisense
  – oligodeoxyribonucleotides, antisense
  – DNA, archaeal
  – DNA, bacterial
  – DNA, c-form
  – DNA, catalytic
  – DNA, circular
  – DNA, catenated
  – DNA, chloroplast
  – DNA, mitochondrial
  – DNA, kinetoplast
  – DNA, superhelical
  – DNA, concatenated
  – DNA, cruciform
  – DNA, fungal
  – DNA, helminth
  – DNA, intergenic
  – DNA, ribosomal spacer
  – DNA, neoplasm
  – DNA, plant
  – DNA, chloroplast
  – DNA, protozoan
  – DNA, kinetoplast
  – DNA, recombinant
  – DNA, ribosomal
  – DNA, ribosomal spacer
  – DNA, satellite
  – DNA, single-stranded
  – DNA, complementary
  – DNA transposable elements
  – DNA, viral
  – DNA, z-form
  – isochores
  – retroelements

– nucleic acid heteroduplexes

– nucleic acid probes
  – antisense elements (genetics)
  – DNA, antisense
  – oligodeoxyribonucleotides, antisense
  – oligonucleotides, antisense
  – oligodeoxyribonucleotides, antisense
  – oligoribonucleotides, antisense
  – rna, antisense
  – oligoribonucleotides, antisense
  – DNA probes
  – DNA, complementary
  – DNA probes, hla
  – DNA probes, hpv
  – oligonucleotide probes
  – rna probes
  – rna, complementary

– peptide nucleic acids

– rna
  – rna, algal
  – rna, antisense
  – micrornas
  – oligoribonucleotides, antisense
  – rna, small interfering
  – rna, archaeal
  – rna, bacterial
  – rna, chloroplast
  – rna, complementary
  – rna, double-stranded
  – rna, fungal
  – rna, helminth
  – rna, messenger
  – codon
  – codon, initiator
  – codon, terminator
  – codon, nonsense
  – rna caps
  – rna cap analogs
  – rna, messenger, stored
  – rna splice sites
  – untranslated regions
  – 3' untranslated regions
  – 5' untranslated regions
  – rna, neoplasm
  – rna, nuclear
  – rna, heterogeneous nuclear
  – rna, small nuclear
  – rna, small nucleolar
  – rna, plant
  – rna, chloroplast
  – rna precursors
  – rna, protozoan
  – rna, ribosomal
  – rna, ribosomal, 5s
  – rna, ribosomal, 5.8s
  – rna, ribosomal, 16s
  – rna, ribosomal, 18s
  – rna, ribosomal, 23s
  – rna, ribosomal, 28s
  – rna, ribosomal, self-splicing
  – rna, satellite
  – cucumber mosaic virus satellite
  – rna, transfer
  – anticodon
  – rna, transfer, amino acid-specific
  – rna, transfer, ala
  – rna, transfer, arg
  – rna, transfer, asn
  – rna, transfer, asp
  – rna, transfer, cys
  – rna, transfer, gln
  – rna, transfer, glu
  – rna, transfer, gly
  – rna, transfer, his
  – rna, transfer, ile
  – rna, transfer, leu
  – rna, transfer, lys
  – rna, transfer, met
  – rna, transfer, phe
  – rna, transfer, pro
  – rna, transfer, ser
  – rna, transfer, thr
  – rna, transfer, trp
  – rna, transfer, tyr
  – rna, transfer, val
  – rna, transfer, amino acyl
  – rna, untranslated
  – micrornas
  – regulatory sequences, ribonucleic acid
  – rna, catalytic
  – rna, guide
  – rna, small cytoplasmic
  – rna, small interfering
  – rna, small nuclear
  – rna, small nucleolar
  – rna, spliced leader
  – untranslated regions
  – 3' untranslated regions
  – 5' untranslated regions
  – rna, viral

– nucleosides

– arabinonucleosides
  – arabinofuranosyluracil
  – cytarabine
  – ancitabine
  – vidarabine

– deoxyribonucleosides
  – deoxyadenosines
  – cladribine
  – dideoxyadenosine
  – puromycin aminonucleoside
  – deoxycytidine
  – bromodeoxycytidine
  – zalcitabine
  – lamivudine
  – deoxyguanosine
  – deoxyuridine
  – bromodeoxyuridine
  – floxuridine
  – idoxuridine
  – dideoxynucleosides
  – didanosine
  – dideoxyadenosine
  – stavudine
  – zalcitabine
  – lamivudine
  – zidovudine
  – pentostatin
  – thymidine
  – stavudine
  – trifluridine
  – zidovudine

– purine nucleosides
  – adenosine
  – adenosine-5'-(n-ethylcarboxamide)
  – s-adenosylhomocysteine
  – s-adenosylmethionine
  – 2-chloroadenosine
  – cladribine
  – deoxyadenosines
  – cladribine
  – dideoxyadenosine
  – puromycin aminonucleoside
  – isopentenyladenosine
  – phenylisopropyladenosine
  – puromycin
  – puromycin aminonucleoside
  – vidarabine
  – guanosine
  – deoxyguanosine
  – nucleoside q
  – inosine
  – didanosine
  – inosine pranobex
  – thioinosine
  – methylthioinosine
  – tubercidin

– pyrimidine nucleosides
  – cytidine
  – azacitidine
  – cytarabine
  – ancitabine
  – deoxycytidine
  – bromodeoxycytidine
  – zalcitabine
  – lamivudine
  – formycins
  – coformycin
  – pentostatin
  – thymidine
  – stavudine
  – trifluridine
  – zidovudine
  – tunicamycin
  – uridine
  – arabinofuranosyluracil
  – azauridine
  – 3-deazauridine
  – deoxyuridine
  – bromodeoxyuridine
  – floxuridine
  – idoxuridine
  – pseudouridine
  – tetrahydrouridine
  – thiouridine

– ribonucleosides
  – adenosine
  – adenosine-5'-(n-ethylcarboxamide)
  – s-adenosylhomocysteine
  – s-adenosylmethionine
  – 2-chloroadenosine
  – cladribine
  – isopentenyladenosine
  – phenylisopropyladenosine
  – cytidine
  – azacitidine
  – dichlororibofuranosylbenzimidazole
  – formycins
  – coformycin
  – guanosine
  – nucleoside q
  – inosine
  – didanosine
  – inosine pranobex
  – thioinosine
  – methylthioinosine
  – ribavirin
  – showdomycin
  – toyocamycin
  – tubercidin
  – uridine
  – azauridine
  – 3-deazauridine
  – pseudouridine
  – tetrahydrouridine
  – thiouridine

– thionucleosides
  – thioinosine
  – methylthioinosine
  – thiouridine

– nucleotides

– arabinonucleotides
  – arabinofuranosylcytosine triphosphate
  – vidarabine phosphate

– deoxyribonucleotides
  – deoxyadenine nucleotides
  – deoxycytosine nucleotides
  – deoxycytidine monophosphate
  – deoxyguanine nucleotides
  – deoxyuracil nucleotides
  – fluorodeoxyuridylate
  – nucleoside diphosphate sugars
  – thymine nucleotides
  – thymidine monophosphate

– dinucleoside phosphates

– nucleotides, cyclic
  – cyclic amp
  – 8-bromo cyclic adenosine monophosphate
  – bucladesine
  – cyclic cmp
  – cyclic gmp
  – dibutyryl cyclic gmp
  – cyclic imp

– polynucleotides
  – oligonucleotides
  – aptamers, nucleotide
  – oligodeoxyribonucleotides
  – DNA primers
  – oligonucleotides, antisense
  – oligodeoxyribonucleotides, antisense
  – oligoribonucleotides, antisense
  – oligoribonucleotides
  – pyrimidine dimers
  – polydeoxyribonucleotides
  – apurinic acid
  – poly da-dt
  – poly t
  – polyribonucleotides
  – apurinic acid
  – poly a
  – poly a-u
  – poly adenosine diphosphate ribose
  – poly c
  – poly i-c
  – poly g
  – poly i
  – poly i-c
  – poly u
  – poly a-u

– purine nucleotides
  – adenine nucleotides
  – adenosine diphosphate
  – adenosine diphosphate sugars
  – adenosine diphosphate glucose
  – adenosine diphosphate ribose
  – o-acetyl-adp-ribose
  – cyclic adp-ribose
  – adenosine monophosphate
  – adenosine phosphosulfate
  – adenosine triphosphate
  – adenylyl imidodiphosphate
  – ethenoadenosine triphosphate
  – coenzyme a
  – acyl coenzyme a
  – acetyl coenzyme a
  – malonyl coenzyme a
  – palmitoyl coenzyme a
  – cyclic amp
  – 8-bromo cyclic adenosine monophosphate
  – bucladesine
  – deoxyadenine nucleotides
  – flavin-adenine dinucleotide
  – nad
  – nadp
  – phosphoadenosine phosphosulfate
  – vidarabine phosphate
  – guanine nucleotides
  – cyclic gmp
  – dibutyryl cyclic gmp
  – deoxyguanine nucleotides
  – guanosine diphosphate
  – guanosine diphosphate sugars
  – guanosine diphosphate fucose
  – guanosine diphosphate mannose
  – guanosine pentaphosphate
  – guanosine tetraphosphate
  – guanosine triphosphate
  – guanosine 5'-o-(3-thiotriphosphate)
  – guanylyl imidodiphosphate
  – 5'-guanylic acid
  – rna caps
  – rna cap analogs
  – inosine nucleotides
  – cyclic imp
  – inosine diphosphate
  – inosine monophosphate
  – inosine triphosphate

– pyrimidine nucleotides
  – apurinic acid
  – cytosine nucleotides
  – arabinofuranosylcytosine triphosphate
  – cyclic cmp
  – cytidine diphosphate
  – cytidine diphosphate choline
  – cytidine diphosphate diglycerides
  – cytidine monophosphate
  – cytidine monophosphate n-acetylneuraminic acid
  – cytidine triphosphate
  – deoxycytosine nucleotides
  – deoxycytidine monophosphate
  – pyrimidine dimers
  – thymine nucleotides
  – thymidine monophosphate
  – uracil nucleotides
  – deoxyuracil nucleotides
  – fluorodeoxyuridylate
  – uridine diphosphate
  – uridine diphosphate sugars
  – uridine diphosphate n-acetylgalactosamine
  – uridine diphosphate n-acetylglucosamine
  – uridine diphosphate n-acetylmuramic acid
  – uridine diphosphate galactose
  – uridine diphosphate glucose
  – uridine diphosphate glucuronic acid
  – uridine diphosphate xylose
  – uridine monophosphate
  – uridine triphosphate

– ribonucleotides
  – adenine nucleotides
  – adenosine diphosphate
  – adenosine diphosphate sugars
  – adenosine diphosphate glucose
  – adenosine diphosphate ribose
  – o-acetyl-adp-ribose
  – cyclic adp-ribose
  – adenosine monophosphate
  – adenosine phosphosulfate
  – adenosine triphosphate
  – adenylyl imidodiphosphate
  – ethenoadenosine triphosphate
  – coenzyme a
  – acyl coenzyme a
  – acetyl coenzyme a
  – malonyl coenzyme a
  – palmitoyl coenzyme a
  – cyclic amp
  – 8-bromo cyclic adenosine monophosphate
  – bucladesine
  – flavin-adenine dinucleotide
  – nad
  – nadp
  – phosphoadenosine phosphosulfate
  – cytosine nucleotides
  – cyclic cmp
  – cytidine diphosphate
  – cytidine diphosphate choline
  – cytidine diphosphate diglycerides
  – cytidine monophosphate
  – cytidine monophosphate n-acetylneuraminic acid
  – cytidine triphosphate
  – flavin mononucleotide
  – guanine nucleotides
  – cyclic gmp
  – dibutyryl cyclic gmp
  – guanosine diphosphate
  – guanosine diphosphate sugars
  – guanosine diphosphate fucose
  – guanosine diphosphate mannose
  – guanosine pentaphosphate
  – guanosine tetraphosphate
  – guanosine triphosphate
  – guanosine 5'-o-(3-thiotriphosphate)
  – guanylyl imidodiphosphate
  – 5'-guanylic acid
  – rna caps
  – rna cap analogs
  – inosine nucleotides
  – cyclic imp
  – inosine diphosphate
  – inosine monophosphate
  – inosine triphosphate
  – nicotinamide mononucleotide
  – nucleoside diphosphate sugars
  – adenosine diphosphate sugars
  – adenosine diphosphate glucose
  – adenosine diphosphate ribose
  – o-acetyl-adp-ribose
  – cyclic adp-ribose
  – poly adenosine diphosphate ribose
  – cytidine diphosphate diglycerides
  – guanosine diphosphate sugars
  – guanosine diphosphate fucose
  – guanosine diphosphate mannose
  – uridine diphosphate sugars
  – uridine diphosphate n-acetylgalactosamine
  – uridine diphosphate n-acetylglucosamine
  – uridine diphosphate n-acetylmuramic acid
  – uridine diphosphate galactose
  – uridine diphosphate glucose
  – uridine diphosphate glucuronic acid
  – uridine diphosphate xylose
  – uracil nucleotides
  – uridine diphosphate
  – uridine diphosphate sugars
  – uridine diphosphate n-acetylgalactosamine
  – uridine diphosphate n-acetylglucosamine
  – uridine diphosphate n-acetylmuramic acid
  – uridine diphosphate galactose
  – uridine diphosphate glucose
  – uridine diphosphate glucuronic acid
  – uridine diphosphate xylose
  – uridine monophosphate
  – uridine triphosphate

– thionucleotides
  – guanosine 5'-o-(3-thiotriphosphate)

The list continues at List of MeSH codes (D20).

MeSH
D13